The Arab Baath, also known as the Arab Baath Party was an Arab nationalist political party founded in Syria by Zaki al-Arsuzi in 1940.

Arsuzi was previously a member of the League of Nationalist Action but left in 1939 after its popular leader died and the party had fallen into disarray, he founded the short-lived Arab National Party in 1939 and dissolved it later that year. He formed the Arab Baath in 1940 and his views influenced Michel Aflaq who, alongside junior partner Salah al-Din al-Bitar, founded the Arab Ihya Movement in 1940 that later renamed itself the Arab Baath Movement in 1943. Though Aflaq was influenced by him, Arsuzi initially did not cooperate with Aflaq's movement. Arsuzi suspected that the existence of the Arab Ihya Movement, which occasionally titled itself "Arab Baath" during 1941, was part of an imperialist plot to prevent his influence over the Arabs by creating a movement of the same name.

A significant conflict between Arsuzi's and Aflaq's movements occurred when they sparred over the issue of the 1941 coup d'etat by Rashid Ali al-Gaylani and the subsequent Anglo–Iraqi War. Aflaq's movement supported al-Gaylani's government and the Iraqi government's war against the British, and organized volunteers to go to Iraq and fight for the Iraqi government. However, Arsuzi opposed al-Gaylani's government, considering the coup to be poorly-planned and a failure. At this point, Arsuzi's party lost members and support that transferred to Aflaq's movement.

Subsequently, Arsuzi's direct influence in Arab politics collapsed after Vichy French authorities expelled him from Syria in 1941. Aflaq's next major political action was its support of Lebanon's war of independence from France in 1943. The two movements eventually merged in 1947 without the involvement of Arsuzi.

See also
Arab Socialist Movement
League of Nationalist Action

References

1940 establishments in Mandatory Syria
1947 disestablishments in Syria
Arab nationalism in Syria
Ba'athist parties
Defunct political parties in Syria
History of the Ba'ath Party
Nationalist parties in Syria
Political parties disestablished in 1947
Political parties established in 1940